is a Japanese actor and voice actor.

Filmography

Film
 Japan's Longest Day (1967) (Michinori Shiraishi)
 Violent Cop (1989) (Deputy Police Chief Higuchi)
 Spellbound (1999) (Ōta)
 Kumiko, the Treasure Hunter (2014) (Sakagami)

Television dramas
 NHK Taiga drama
 San Shimai (1967)
 Ryōma ga Yuku (1968) (Tōdō Heisuke)
 Ten to Chi to (1969)
 Katsu Kaishū (1974)
 Genroku Taiheiki (1975) (Matsumae Yoshihiro)
 Kashin (1977)
 Ōgon no Hibi (1978) (Kuroda Kanbei)
 Tōge no Gunzō (1982) (Okado Shigetomo)
 Tokugawa Ieyasu (1983) (Hayashi Hidesada)
 Haruno Hatō (1985)
 Dokuganryū Masamune (1987) (Gotō Matabei)
 Homura Tatsu (1993) (Adachi Morinaga)
 Tokugawa Yoshinobu (1998) (Kawaji Toshiakira)
 Ultra Q (1966) (fisherman)
 Daichūshingura (1971)
 Taiyō ni Hoero! (1972–1983)
 Ōedo Sōsamō (1975–1981)
 G-Men '75 (1976)
 Mito Kōmon (1976–1991)
 Sanbiki ga Kiru! (1988)
 Dr. Coto's Clinic (2003)

Television animation
 Monster (2004) (Roberto)
 Golgo 13 (2008) (Ted Conan)
 Persona : Trinity Soul (2008) (Mariya Kujou, Keisuke Komatsubara)
 Berserk (2016) (Midland King)

Video games
 Final Fantasy XV (2016) (Cid Sophiar)

OVA
 Master Keaton (1999) (Prof. Takakura)

Theatrical animation
 009 Re:Cyborg (2012) (Professor Isaac Gilmore)
 Berserk Golden Age Arc I: The Egg of the King (2012) (Midland King)
 Berserk Golden Age Arc II: The Battle for Doldrey (2012) (Midland King)

Dubbing roles

Live-action
300: Rise of an Empire (Darius I (Yigal Naor))
42 (Branch Rickey (Harrison Ford))
The 4400 (Senator Rolan Lenhoff (Kevin Tighe))
Alias (Jack Bristow (Victor Garber))
Bad Lieutenant: Port of Call New Orleans (Pat McDonagh (Tom Bower))
The Big Lebowski (VHS edition) (The Stranger (Sam Elliott))
The Big Lebowski (DVD/Blu-ray editions) (Jackie Treehorn (Ben Gazzara))
The Bionic Woman (Oscar Goldman (Richard Anderson))
Blackway (Lester (Anthony Hopkins))
The Bucket List (Edward Cole (Jack Nicholson))
Bullitt (1977 TV Asahi edition) (Delgetti (Don Gordon))
Cinderella Man (James Johnston (Bruce McGill))
Coming 2 America (King Jaffe Joffer (James Earl Jones))
Delivery Man (Mikolaj Wozniak (Andrzej Blumenfeld))
Did You Hear About the Morgans? (Clay Wheeler (Sam Elliott))
Dolphin Tale (Reed Haskett (Kris Kristofferson))
Dune (Baron Vladimir Harkonnen (Stellan Skarsgård))
Edge of Tomorrow (General Brigham (Brendan Gleeson))
Elizabeth (Francis Walsingham (Geoffrey Rush))
Elizabeth: The Golden Age (Francis Walsingham (Geoffrey Rush))
Enemy of the State (Edward "Brill" Lyle (Gene Hackman))
Goal! (Erik Dornhelm (Marcel Iureș))
The Great Gatsby (Meyer Wolfshiem (Amitabh Bachchan))
Hannibal (2003 TV Asahi edition) (Chief Inspector Rinaldo Pazzi) (Giancarlo Giannini))
The Hateful Eight (General Sanford "Sandy" Smithers (Bruce Dern))
The Jacket (Dr. Thomas Becker (Kris Kristofferson))
John Wick: Chapter 2 (Julius (Franco Nero))
The Last Word (Edward (Philip Baker Hall))
Lifeforce (2005 TV Asahi edition) (Dr. Hans Fallada (Frank Finlay))
Lucky Number Slevin (The Boss (Morgan Freeman))
Mackenna's Gold (TV Asahi edition) (John Colorado (Omar Sharif))
Maleficent (King Henry (Kenneth Cranham))
Nebraska (Woodrow T. Grant (Bruce Dern))
The Notebook (Old Noah Calhoun (James Garner))
 (Lorenzo (Giancarlo Giannini))
The Omen (Father Brennan (Pete Postlethwaite))
Parker (Hurley (Nick Nolte))
Paul, Apostle of Christ (Paul (James Faulkner))
Pete's Dragon (Mr. Meacham (Robert Redford))
Pirates of the Caribbean: On Stranger Tides (Edward "Blackbeard" Teach (Ian McShane))
Rambo: First Blood Part II (1987 NTV edition) (Marshall Murdock (Charles Napier))
Red 2 (Dr. Edward Bailey (Anthony Hopkins))
Rémi sans famille (Elder Rémi (Jacques Perrin))
Rooster Cogburn (Hawk (Richard Jordan))
Ruby Sparks (Dr. Rosenthal (Elliott Gould))
Seven (2001 TV Asahi edition) (Detective Lt. William Somerset (Morgan Freeman))
Something's Gotta Give (Harry Sanborn (Jack Nicholson))
Space Cowboys (Eugene "Gene" Davis (William Devane))
Spider-Man (Ben Parker (Cliff Robertson))
Spider-Man 2 (Ben Parker (Cliff Robertson))
Spider-Man 3 (Ben Parker (Cliff Robertson))
Starship Troopers (Lt. Jean Rasczak (Michael Ironside))
Stiletto (Virgil Vadalos (Tom Berenger))
The Surprise (Cornald Muller (Jan Decleir))
Touch (Professor Arthur Teller (Danny Glover))
The Tourist (Reginald Shaw (Steven Berkoff))
Transformers: Dark of the Moon (Sentinel Prime (Leonard Nimoy))
The Undoing (Franklin Reinhardt (Donald Sutherland))
Veronica Guerin (John Gilligan (Gerard McSorley))
Warrior (Paddy Conlon (Nick Nolte))
Watchmen (Will Reeves (Louis Gossett Jr.))
Zorro (1977 TV Asahi edition) (Colonel Huerta (Stanley Baker))

Animation
 Toy Story 3 (Lots-O'-Huggin' Bear)

References

External links
 En-kikaku profile
 

1938 births
Japanese male film actors
Japanese male television actors
Japanese male video game actors
Japanese male voice actors
Living people
Male actors from Tokyo
20th-century Japanese male actors
21st-century Japanese male actors